Cannanore Indo-Portuguese is an Indo-Portuguese creole spoken on the Malabar coast of India. It formed from contact between the Portuguese and Malayalam languages in Indo-Portuguese households in the city of Kannur. In 2010 it was estimated to have five native speakers remaining.  But there are around twenty or more who are dispersed in India and other parts of the world. It could have formed after the Cochin Indo-Portuguese.

References

Portuguese-based pidgins and creoles
Portuguese diaspora in Asia
Portuguese language in Asia